Baltimore Arena station (formerly University Center / Baltimore Street) is a Baltimore Light Rail station in Baltimore, Maryland adjacent to the CFG Bank Arena.

References

External links

MTA Maryland - Light Rail stations
 Station from Google Maps Street View

1992 establishments in Maryland
Baltimore Light Rail stations
Downtown Baltimore
Railway stations in Baltimore
Railway stations in the United States opened in 1992